Ebubekir Pasha (1670 – 1757/1758), also referred to as Koca Bekir Pasha and Abu Bakr Pasha, was an Ottoman statesman. He served as Kapudan Pasha (Grand Admiral of the Navy; 1732–33, 1750–51); as governor (beylerbey) of the provinces of Egypt, Jeddah, Cyprus, and Bosnia; and as head of the Imperial Mint. He was the husband of Safiye Sultan and thus son-in-law (damat) of Sultan Mustafa II.

A great philanthropist, Koca Bekir Pasha was considered one of the most enlightened and productive statesmen of his time.

Background
Ebubekir was born in 1670 in Alaiye (modern-day Alanya, Turkey).

Bekir Pasha (Kamares) Aqueduct

His most notable legacy is the still-standing Kamares Aqueduct, also known as the Bekir Pasha Aqueduct, built in 1746 or 1747 during his tenure as the Governor of Cyprus, which he financed personally to aid the water supply to the area.

Realizing the difficulties of fresh water access for the poor in the city, Koca Bekir Pasha built this massive aqueduct to improve the water supply to Larnaca. The water supply works involved a long tunnel, 250 air wells, and three series of overland arches. It was completed by 1746.

Foreign travelers have often counted it as the most important monument constructed during the Ottoman period in Cyprus. In 1754, Alexander Drummond noted that:

The aqueduct was repaired in 1856, and the renewed structure made it possible for the aqueduct to remain in active use until the 1950s. Relics of the aqueduct still stand outside Larnaca and are referred to as "The Kamares" ("The Arches") today. The aqueduct is illuminated at night.

Other work
His signature is found under many major construction and reconstruction projects in every city he served as a governor.

During his tenure as the Governor of Cyprus, he helped revitalise the local economy by having 23 shops built in Nicosia financed by his personal funds.

Death and legacy
Koca Bekir Pasha died in 1757 or 1758 at the age of about 88 and was buried in Aksaray in Istanbul.

He donated his property to a foundation in his name and his will has been documented in detail.

See also
List of admirals in the Ottoman Empire
List of Ottoman Kapudan Pashas
List of Ottoman governors of Egypt
List of Ottoman governors of Bosnia
Ottoman Cyprus

Footnotes

References

External links
 Ebubekir Paşa ve Kıbrıs’taki İmar Faaliyetleri

1670 births
1750s deaths
17th-century people from the Ottoman Empire
18th-century Ottoman governors of Egypt
Kapudan Pashas
Pashas
Damats
Ottoman governors of Egypt
Ottoman governors of Bosnia
Ottoman governors of Cyprus